In mathematics, the Volterra lattice, also known as the discrete KdV equation,  the Kac–van Moerbeke lattice, and the Langmuir lattice, is a system of ordinary differential equations with variables indexed by some of the points of a 1-dimensional lattice. The Volterra lattice is a special case of the generalized Lotka–Volterra equation describing predator–prey interactions, for a sequence of species with each species preying on the next in the sequence. The Volterra lattice also behaves like a discrete version of the KdV equation. The Volterra lattice is an integrable system, and is related to the Toda lattice. It is also used as a model for Langmuir waves in plasmas.

Definition

The Volterra lattice is the set of ordinary differential equations for functions an:

an' = an(an+1 – an–1)

where n is an integer. Usually one adds boundary conditions: for example, the functions an could be periodic: an = an+N for some N, or could vanish for n ≤ 0 and n ≥ N.

The Volterra lattice was originally stated in terms of the variables Rn = –log an in which case the equations are
 Rn' = e−Rn–1 – e−Rn+1

References

 

Integrable systems